The Dome of al-Khalili or the Hebronite is a small domed-building located in the central platform of the Temple Mount (Haram ash-Sharif), north of the Dome of the Rock in the Old City of Jerusalem. The building is made of bricks which are currently tarnished. The Dome of al-Khalili was built in the early 18th century during Ottoman rule of Palestine in dedication to Shaykh Muhammad al-Khalili, a scholar of fiqh who died in 1734.

References

Temple Mount
Religious buildings and structures with domes
18th-century religious buildings and structures